Adam Clay may refer to:

 Adam Clay (rugby league) (born 1990), English rugby league player
 Adam Clay (soccer) (born 1982), American soccer player
Adam Clay, Captain Boomerang#Other versions